Stafford power station supplied electricity to the town of Stafford, England and the surrounding area from 1895 to 1958. It was owned and operated by Stafford Corporation prior to the nationalisation of the British electricity supply industry in 1948. The power station was redeveloped in the 1920s, but after 1935 it was a standby plant used at times of peak demand. Stafford power station was decommissioned in 1958.

History
In 1890 Stafford Corporation applied for a Provisional Order under the Electric Lighting Acts to generate and supply electricity to the town. This was granted by the Board of Trade and was confirmed by Parliament through the Electric Lighting Orders Confirmation (No. 8) Act 1890 (54 & 55 Vict. c. cxciii). The power station was built north of the corporation gas works near the River Sow (52°48'31"N 2°07'18"W) and first supplied electricity on 15 October 1895.

Stafford power station was operated under the direction of the Central Electricity Board from 1 April 1934. From 1935 it was used as a standby station.

Equipment specification
The original plant at Stafford power station comprised Marshall compound engines coupled by ropes to Elwell-Parker dynamos. In 1898 the generating capacity was 198 kW and the maximum load was 80 kW, there were 6,200 lamps on the circuits.

Plant 1923
By 1923 the generating plant comprised:

 Coal-fired boilers generating up to 62,000 lb/h (7.8 kg/s) of steam which was supplied to:
 Generators:                                          
 1 × 150 kW reciprocating engine driving a generator
 1 × 220 kW reciprocating engine driving a generator
 1 × 500 kW reciprocating engine driving a generator
 1 × 500 kW steam turbo-generator
 1 × 1,000 kW steam turbo-alternator
 1 × 1,600 kW steam turbo-alternator

These machines gave a total generating capacity of 2,600 kW of alternating current and 1,370 kW of direct current.

A variety of electricity supplies were available to consumers:

 3-phase, 50 Hz AC at 6,000 Volts, 400 and 230 Volts.
 420 & 210 Volts DC.

New plant 1925 & 1927
New plant was commissioned in 1925 and 1927.

 Boilers:
 1 × Stirling boiler 12,000 lb/h (1.5 kg/s)
 1 × Stirling boiler 15,000 lb/h (1.9 kg/s)
 2 × Stirling boilers 20,000 lb/h (2.5 kg/s)
 1 × Stirling boiler 40,000 lb/h (5.0 kg/s)

The total evaporative capacity of the boilers was 107,000 lb/hr (13.5 kg/s).

Steam conditions were 180 psi and 525°F (12.4 bar, 274°C), and 200 psi at 550 & 590°F (13.8 bar at 288 & 310°C) , steam was supplied to:

 Turbo-alternators:
 2 × English Electric 3.0 MW turbo-alternator, generating at 6.6 kV.

Condenser cooling water was drawn from the River Sow.

Operations

Operating data 1898
In 1898 82,172 kWh was sold to 90 consumers, plus 41,729 kWh for public lamps.

Operating data 1921–23
The operating data for the period 1921–23 is shown in the table:

Operating data 1934–36
Under the terms of the Electricity (Supply) Act 1926 (16 & 17 Geo. 5 c. 51) the Central Electricity Board (CEB) was established in 1926. The CEB identified high efficiency ‘selected’ power stations that would supply electricity most effectively. Stafford power station was operated under the direction of the CEB from 1934. The CEB also constructed the national grid (1927–33) to connect power stations within a region. The operating data for 1934-36 was:

Operating data 1946
In 1946 Stafford power station sent out 5,035 MWh of electricity, the maximum load was 7432 kW.

The British electricity supply industry was nationalised in 1948 under the provisions of the Electricity Act 1947 (10-11 Geo. 6 c. 54). The Stafford electricity undertaking was abolished, ownership of Stafford power station was vested in the British Electricity Authority, and subsequently the Central Electricity Authority and the Central Electricity Generating Board (CEGB).At the same time the electricity distribution and sales responsibilities of the Stafford electricity undertaking were transferred to the Midlands Electricity Board (MEB).

Operating data 1954–58
Operating data for the period 1954–58 is shown in the table:

Closure
Stafford power station was decommissioned in 1958. The buildings were demolished and the area has been redeveloped with commercial facilities.

See also
 Timeline of the UK electricity supply industry
 List of power stations in England

References

Coal-fired power stations in England
Demolished power stations in the United Kingdom
Former power stations in England
Buildings and structures in Stafford